James W. Brown was a Scottish professional footballer who played in the Scottish League for Cowdenbeath, St Bernard's, Lochgelly United, Heart of Midlothian and Hamilton Academical as a centre half.

Personal life 
Brown served in the Royal Scots during the First World War and after his retirement from football, he became the High Chief Ruler of a Fife branch of the Independent Order of Rechabites.

Career statistics

Honours 

Cowdenbeath Hall of Fame

References

Scottish footballers
Cowdenbeath F.C. players
Scottish Football League players
Date of death missing
Association football wing halves
St Bernard's F.C. players
Year of birth missing
Footballers from West Lothian
1955 deaths
Place of death missing
Linlithgow Rose F.C. players
Celtic F.C. players
Royal Albert F.C. players
Heart of Midlothian F.C. players
Rangers F.C. players
Dunfermline Athletic F.C. players
Lochgelly United F.C. players
British Army personnel of World War I
Royal Scots soldiers
Scottish temperance activists